In the mathematical discipline of complex analysis, the analytic capacity of a compact subset K of the complex plane is a number that denotes "how big" a bounded analytic function on C \ K can become. Roughly speaking, γ(K) measures the size of the unit ball of the space of bounded analytic functions outside K.

It was first introduced by Lars Ahlfors in the 1940s while studying the removability of singularities of bounded analytic functions.

Definition
Let K ⊂ C be compact. Then its analytic capacity is defined to be

Here,  denotes the set of bounded analytic functions U → C, whenever U is an open subset of the complex plane. Further,

Note that , where . However, usually .  

If A ⊂ C is an arbitrary set, then we define

Removable sets and Painlevé's problem
The compact set K is called removable if, whenever Ω is an open set containing K, every function which is bounded and holomorphic on the set Ω \ K has an analytic extension to all of Ω. By Riemann's theorem for removable singularities, every singleton is removable. This motivated Painlevé to pose a more general question in 1880: "Which subsets of C are removable?"

It is easy to see that K is removable if and only if γ(K) = 0. However, analytic capacity is a purely complex-analytic concept, and much more work needs to be done in order to obtain a more geometric characterization.

Ahlfors function
For each compact K ⊂ C, there exists a unique extremal function, i.e.  such that , f(∞) = 0 and f′(∞) = γ(K). This function is called the Ahlfors function of K. Its existence can be proved by using a normal family argument involving Montel's theorem.

Analytic capacity in terms of Hausdorff dimension
Let dimH denote Hausdorff dimension and H1 denote 1-dimensional Hausdorff measure. Then H1(K) = 0 implies γ(K) = 0 while dimH(K) > 1 guarantees γ(K) > 0. However, the case when dimH(K) = 1 and H1(K) ∈ (0, ∞] is more difficult.

Positive length but zero analytic capacity
Given the partial correspondence between the 1-dimensional Hausdorff measure of a compact subset of C and its analytic capacity, it might be conjectured that γ(K) = 0 implies H1(K) = 0. However, this conjecture is false. A counterexample was first given by A. G. Vitushkin, and a much simpler one by John B. Garnett in his 1970 paper. This latter example is the linear four corners Cantor set, constructed as follows:

Let K0 := [0, 1] × [0, 1] be the unit square. Then, K1 is the union of 4 squares of side length 1/4 and these squares are located in the corners of K0. Take K to be the intersection of all Kn then  but γ(K) = 0.

Vitushkin's conjecture
Let K ⊂ C be a compact set. Vitushkin's conjecture states that

where  denotes the orthogonal projection in direction θ. By the results described above, Vitushkin's conjecture is true when dimHK ≠ 1.

Guy David published a proof in 1998 of Vitushkin's conjecture for the case dimHK = 1 and H1(K) < ∞. In 2002, Xavier Tolsa proved that analytic capacity is countably semiadditive.

David's and Tolsa's theorems together imply that Vitushkin's conjecture is true when K is H1-sigma-finite. However, the conjecture is still open for K which are 1-dimensional and not H1-sigma-finite.

References
 
 
 J. Garnett, Positive length but zero analytic capacity, Proc. Amer. Math. Soc. 21 (1970), 696–699
 G. David, Unrectifiable 1-sets have vanishing analytic capacity, Rev. Math. Iberoam. 14 (1998) 269–479